The following is the filmography of American actor Gary Busey.

Film

Television

Video games

References

External links
 
 

Busey, Gary
American filmographies